Achille Pace (1 June 1923 – 28 September 2021) was an Italian painter. His work is held in the collection of the Galleria Nazionale d'Arte Moderna in Rome.

References

1923 births
2021 deaths
20th-century Italian painters
21st-century Italian painters
Italian male painters
20th-century Italian male artists
People from the Province of Campobasso
21st-century Italian male artists